Charles Gonzaga (6 May 1580 – 22 September 1637) was Duke of Mantua and Duke of Montferrat from 1627 until his death. He was also Charles III Duke of Nevers and Rethel, as well as Prince of Arche and Charleville.

Biography

Born in Paris on 6 May 1580, Charles was the son of Louis Gonzaga, Duke of Nevers, and Princess Henriette of Cleves. In 1600, as duke of Rethel, he founded, in Nevers, the Order of the Yellow Ribbon, soon forbidden by the King, due to its peculiar character. In 1606, Charles decided the foundation of Charleville and the Principality of Arches ( fr ) He became 1st Prince of Arche and Charleville

In 1612, Charles, a descendant of the Byzantine Emperor Andronicus II Palaeologus through his grandmother Margaret Paleologa, who was of the line of Theodore I, Marquess of Montferrat, Andronicus's son, claimed the throne of Constantinople, at the time the capital of the Ottoman Empire. He began plotting with Greek rebels, including the Maniots of Greece, who addressed him as "King Constantine Palaeologus". When the Ottoman authorities heard about this, they sent an army of 20,000 men and 70 ships to invade Mani. They succeeded in ravaging the Mani Peninsula and imposing taxes on the Maniots. This caused Charles to move more actively for his crusade. He sent envoys to the courts of Europe looking for support. In 1619, he recruited six ships and some five thousand men, but a fire started by a possible incendiary prevented their journey.

Following the death of the last legitimate male heir of the Gonzaga line in the Duchy of Mantua, Vincenzo II (1627), Charles inherited the title through an agreement. His succession, however, spurred the enmity of Charles Emmanuel I of Savoy, who aimed at the Gonzaga lands of Montferrat, and, above all, of Spain and the Holy Roman Empire, which did not like a pro-French ruler in Mantua. This led to the War of the Mantuan Succession. In 1629 emperor Ferdinand II sent a Landsknecht army to besiege Mantua, Charles left without the promised support from Louis XIII of France. The siege lasted until 18 July 1630, when the city, already struck by a plague, was brutally sacked for three days. Mantua never recovered from this disaster.

The subsequent diplomatic maneuvers allowed Charles, who had fled to the Papal States, to return to the duchy in 1631, although not without concessions to the House of Savoy and to the Gonzaga of Guastalla. The fiscal situation of the Mantuan territory was poor, but he was able to facilitate some economic recovery in the following years.

Charles died in 1637. His successor was his grandson Charles II, initially under the regency of Maria Gonzaga, Charles I's daughter-in-law.

Children

Charles married Catherine of Lorraine-Mayenne, daughter of Charles of Lorraine, Duke of Mayenne and Princess Henriette of Savoy. They had:

Francis Gonzaga, Duke of Rethel (1606–1622)
Charles Gonzaga, Duke of Nevers, nominal co-ruler Duke of Mantua (1609 – 14 August 1631) and his heir. Better known as Duke of Nevers and Rethel. Married heiress Maria Gonzaga. They were parents to Eleanor of Mantua consort of the Holy Roman Emperor Ferdinand III, and Charles II, Duke of Mantua and Monferrat.
Ferdinand Gonzaga, Duke of Mayenne (1610 – 25 May 1632)
Marie Louise Gonzaga (18 August 1611 – 10 May 1667). Married first Władysław IV Vasa and secondly John II Casimir of Poland
Benedetta Gonzaga (1614 – 30 September 1637)
Anne Marie Gonzaga (1616 – 6 July 1684). Married first Henry II, Duke of Guise, and secondly Edward, Count Palatine of Simmern.

Honours
 Grand Master of the Order of the Redeemer

Ancestry

References

Sources

|-

|-

External links

Dukes of Mantua
Dukes of Montferrat
Charles
Nobility from Paris
1580 births
1637 deaths
16th-century Italian nobility
17th-century Italian nobility
Burials at the Palatine Basilica of Santa Barbara (Mantua)
16th-century peers of France
17th-century peers of France
Dukes of Nevers
Dukes of Rethel